Walter Frank "Whitey" Hilcher (February 28, 1909 – November 21, 1962) was a Major League Baseball pitcher. Hilcher played for the Cincinnati Reds in 1931, 1932, 1935, and 1936.

During World War II, Hilcher served with the US Army Signal Corps. He died of a heart attack in November 1962 and was buried in the Fort Snelling National Cemetery.

References

External links

1909 births
1962 deaths
Major League Baseball pitchers
Cincinnati Reds players
Baseball players from Chicago
Nashville Vols players